The MOS Technology 6502 (typically pronounced "sixty-five-oh-two" or "six-five-oh-two") is an 8-bit microprocessor that was designed by a small team led by Chuck Peddle for MOS Technology. The design team had formerly worked at Motorola on the Motorola 6800 project; the 6502 is essentially a simplified, less expensive and faster version of that design.

When it was introduced in 1975, the 6502 was the least expensive microprocessor on the market by a considerable margin. It initially sold for less than one-sixth the cost of competing designs from larger companies, such as the 6800 or Intel 8080. Its introduction caused rapid decreases in pricing across the entire processor market. Along with the Zilog Z80, it sparked a series of projects that resulted in the home computer revolution of the early 1980s.

Popular video game consoles and home computers of the 1980s and early 1990s, such as the Atari 2600, Atari 8-bit family, Apple II, Nintendo Entertainment System, Commodore 64, Atari Lynx, BBC Micro and others, use the 6502 or variations of the basic design. Soon after the 6502's introduction, MOS Technology was purchased outright by Commodore International, who continued to sell the microprocessor and licenses to other manufacturers. In the early days of the 6502, it was second-sourced by Rockwell and Synertek, and later licensed to other companies.

In 1981, the Western Design Center started development of a CMOS version, the 65C02. This continues to be widely used in embedded systems, with estimated production volumes in the hundreds of millions.

History and use

Origins at Motorola

The 6502 was designed by many of the same engineers that had designed the Motorola 6800 microprocessor family. Motorola started the 6800 microprocessor project in 1971 with Tom Bennett as the main architect. The chip layout began in late 1972, the first 6800 chips were fabricated in February 1974 and the full family was officially released in November 1974. John Buchanan was the designer of the 6800 chip and Rod Orgill, who later did the 6501, assisted Buchanan with circuit analyses and chip layout. Bill Mensch joined Motorola in June 1971 after graduating from the University of Arizona (at age 26). His first assignment was helping define the peripheral ICs for the 6800 family and later he was the principal designer of the 6820 Peripheral Interface Adapter (PIA). Motorola's engineers could run analog and digital simulations on an IBM 370-165 mainframe computer. Bennett hired Chuck Peddle in 1973 to do architectural support work on the 6800 family products already in progress. He contributed in many areas, including the design of the 6850 ACIA (serial interface).

Motorola's target customers were established electronics companies such as Hewlett-Packard, Tektronix, TRW, and Chrysler. In May 1972, Motorola's engineers began visiting select customers and sharing the details of their proposed 8-bit microprocessor system with ROM, RAM, parallel and serial interfaces. In early 1974, they provided engineering samples of the chips so that customers could prototype their designs. Motorola's "total product family" strategy did not focus on the price of the microprocessor, but on reducing the customer's total design cost. They offered development software on a timeshare computer, the "EXORciser" debugging system, onsite training and field application engineer support. Both Intel and Motorola had initially announced a $360 price for a single microprocessor. The actual price for production quantities was much less. Motorola offered a design kit containing the 6800 with six support chips for $300.

Peddle, who would accompany the salespeople on customer visits, found that customers were put off by the high cost of the microprocessor chips. At the same time, these visits invariably resulted in the engineers he presented to producing lists of required instructions that were much smaller than "all these fancy instructions" that had been included in the 6800. Peddle and other team members started outlining the design of an improved feature, reduced size microprocessor. At that time, Motorola's new semiconductor fabrication facility in Austin, Texas, was having difficulty producing MOS chips, and mid-1974 was the beginning of a year-long recession in the semiconductor industry. Also, many of the Mesa, Arizona employees were displeased with the upcoming relocation to Austin, Texas.

Motorola's Semiconductor Products Division management was overwhelmed with problems and showed no interest in Peddle's low-cost microprocessor proposal. Eventually Peddle was given an official letter telling him to stop working on the system. Peddle responded to the order by informing Motorola that the letter represented an official declaration of "project abandonment", and as such, the intellectual property he had developed to that point was now his. In a November 1975 interview, Motorola's Chairman, Robert Galvin, ultimately agreed that Peddle's concept was a good one and that the division missed an opportunity, "We did not choose the right leaders in the Semiconductor Products division." The division was reorganized and the management replaced. The new group vice-president John Welty said, "The semiconductor sales organization lost its sensitivity to customer needs and couldn't make speedy decisions."

MOS Technology

Peddle began looking outside Motorola for a source of funding for this new project. He initially approached Mostek CEO L. J. Sevin, but he declined. Sevin later admitted this was because he was afraid Motorola would sue them.

While Peddle was visiting Ford Motor Company on one of his sales trips, Bob Johnson, later head of Ford's engine automation division, mentioned that their former colleague John Paivinen had moved to General Instrument and taught himself semiconductor design. Paivinen then formed MOS Technology in Valley Forge, Pennsylvania in 1969 with two other executives from General Instrument, Mort Jaffe and Don McLaughlin. Allen-Bradley, a supplier of electronic components and industrial controls, acquired a majority interest in 1970. The company designed and fabricated custom ICs for customers and had developed a line of calculator chips.

After the Mostek efforts fell through, Peddle approached Paivinen, who "immediately got it". On 19 August 1974, Chuck Peddle, Bill Mensch, Rod Orgill, Harry Bawcom, Ray Hirt, Terry Holdt, and Wil Mathys left Motorola to join MOS. Mike Janes joined later. Of the seventeen chip designers and layout people on the 6800 team, eight left. The goal of the team was to design and produce a low-cost microprocessor for embedded applications and to target as wide as possible a customer base.

Chips are produced by printing multiple copies of the chip design on the surface of a "wafer", a thin disk of highly pure silicon. Smaller chips can be printed in greater numbers on the same wafer, decreasing their relative price. Additionally, wafers always include some number of tiny physical defects that are scattered across the surface. Any chip printed in that location will fail and has to be discarded. Smaller chips mean any single copy is less likely to be printed on a defect. For both of these reasons, the cost of the final product is strongly dependent on the size of the chip design.

Several new techniques would be needed to hit this goal.

Moving to NMOS
There were two significant advances that arrived in the market just as the 6502 was being designed that provided significant cost reductions. The first was the move to depletion-load NMOS. The 6800 used an early NMOS process that required three supply voltages, but one of the chip's features was an onboard voltage doubler that allowed a single +5 V supply be used for +5, −5 and +12 V internally, as opposed to other chips of the era like the Intel 8080 that required three separate supply pins. While this feature reduced the complexity of the power supply and pin layout, it still required separate power rails to the various gates on the chip, driving up complexity and size. By moving to the new depletion-load design, a single +5 V supply was all that was needed, eliminating all of this complexity.

A further practical advantage was that the clock signal for earlier CPUs had to be strong enough to survive all the dissipation as it traveled through the circuits, which almost always required a separate external chip that could supply a powerful signal. With the reduced power requirements of NMOS, the clock could be moved onto the chip, simplifying the overall computer design. These changes greatly reduced complexity and the cost of implementing a complete system.

Another change that was taking place was the introduction of projection masking. Previously, chips were patterned onto the surface of the wafer by placing a mask on the surface of the wafer and then shining a bright light on it. The masks often picked up tiny bits of dirt or photoresist as they were lifted off the chip, causing flaws in those locations on any subsequent masking. With complex designs like CPUs, 5 or 6 such masking steps would be used, and the chance that at least one of these steps would introduce a flaw was very high. In most cases, 90% of such designs were flawed, resulting in a 10% yield. The price of the working examples had to cover the production cost of the 90% that were thrown away.

In 1973, Perkin-Elmer introduced the Micralign system, which projected an image of the mask on the wafer instead of requiring direct contact. Masks no longer picked up dirt from the wafers and lasted on the order of 100,000 uses rather than 10. This eliminated step-to-step failures and the high flaw rates formerly seen on complex designs. Yields on CPUs immediately jumped from 10% to 60 or 70%. This meant the price of the CPU declined roughly the same amount and the microprocessor suddenly became a commodity device.

MOS Technology's existing fabrication lines were based on the older PMOS technology, they had not yet begun to work with NMOS when the team arrived. Paivinen promised to have an NMOS line up and running in time to begin the production of the new CPU. He delivered on the promise, the new line was ready by June 1975.

Design notes
Chuck Peddle, Rod Orgill, and Wil Mathys designed the initial architecture of the new processors. A September 1975 article in EDN magazine gives this summary of the design:
The MOS Technology 650X family represents a conscious attempt of eight former Motorola employees who worked on the development of the 6800 system to put out a part that would replace and outperform the 6800, yet undersell it. With the benefit of hindsight gained on the 6800 project, the MOS Technology team headed by Chuck Peddle, made the following architectural changes in the Motorola CPU…

The main change in terms of chip size was the elimination of the tri-state drivers from the address bus outputs. A three-state bus has states for "1", "0" and "high impedance". The last state is used to allow other devices to access the bus, and is typically used for multiprocessing, or more commonly in these roles, for direct memory access (DMA). While useful, this feature is very expensive in terms of on-chip circuitry. The 6502 simply removed this feature, in keeping with its design as an inexpensive controller being used for specific tasks and communicating with simple devices. Peddle suggested that anyone that actually required this style of access could implement it with a single 74158.

The next major difference was to simplify the registers. To start with, one of the two accumulators was removed. General-purpose registers like accumulators have to be accessed by many parts of the instruction decoder, and thus require significant amounts of wiring to move data to and from their storage. Two accumulators makes many coding tasks easier, but costs the chip design itself significant complexity. Further savings were made by reducing the stack register from 16 to 8 bits, meaning that the stack could only be 256 bytes long, which was enough for its intended role as a microcontroller.

The 16-bit IX index register was split in two, becoming X and Y. More importantly, the style of access changed; in the 6800, IX held a 16-bit address, which was offset by an 8-bit number supplied with the instruction, the two were added to produce the final address. In the 6502 (and most other contemporary designs), the 16-bit base address was stored in the instruction, and the X or Y was added to it.

Finally, the instruction set was simplified, freeing up room in the decoder and control logic. Of the original 72 instructions in the 6800, 56 were implemented. Among those removed were instructions that moved data between the 6800's two accumulators, and several branch instructions inspired by the PDP-11, such as the ability to directly compare two numeric values. The 6502 used a simpler system that handled comparisons by performing a subtraction which set the appropriate flags without saving the result, followed by a conditional branch instruction which tested the flags.

The chip's high-level design had to be turned into drawings of transistors and interconnects. At MOS Technology, the "layout" was a very manual process done with color pencils and vellum paper. The layout consisted of thousands of polygon shapes on six different drawings; one for each layer of the fabrication process. Given the size limits, the entire chip design had to be constantly considered. Mensch and Paivinen worked on the instruction decoder while Mensch, Peddle and Orgill worked on the ALU and registers. A further advance, developed at a party, was a way to share some of the internal wiring to allow the ALU to be reduced in size.

In spite of their best efforts, the final design ended up being 5 mils too wide. The original version of the processor had no rotate right (ROR) capability, so the instruction was omitted from the original documentation. The next iteration of the design shrank the chip and added the rotate right capability, and ROR was included in revised documentation.

Introducing the 6501 and 6502

MOS would introduce two microprocessors based on the same underlying design: the 6501 would plug into the same socket as the Motorola 6800, while the 6502 re-arranged the pinout to support an on-chip clock oscillator. Both would work with other support chips designed for the 6800. They would not run 6800 software because they had a different instruction set, different registers, and mostly different addressing modes. Rod Orgill was responsible for the 6501 design; he had assisted John Buchanan at Motorola on the 6800. Bill Mensch did the 6502; he was the designer of the 6820 Peripheral Interface Adapter (PIA) at Motorola. Harry Bawcom, Mike Janes and Sydney-Anne Holt helped with the layout.

MOS Technology's microprocessor introduction was different from the traditional months-long product launch. The first run of a new integrated circuit is normally used for internal testing and shared with select customers as "engineering samples". These chips often have a minor design defect or two that will be corrected before production begins. Chuck Peddle's goal was to sell the first run 6501 and 6502 chips to the attendees at the WESCON trade show in San Francisco beginning on September 16, 1975. Peddle was a very effective spokesman and the MOS Technology microprocessors were extensively covered in the trade press. One of the earliest was a full-page story on the MCS6501 and MCS6502 microprocessors in the July 24, 1975 issue of Electronics magazine. Stories also ran in EE Times (August 24, 1975), EDN (September 20, 1975), Electronic News (November 3, 1975), Byte (November 1975) and Microcomputer Digest (November 1975). Advertisements for the 6501 appeared in several publications the first week of August 1975. The 6501 would be for sale at Wescon for  each. In September 1975, the advertisements included both the 6501 and the 6502 microprocessors. The 6502 would cost only .

When MOS Technology arrived at Wescon, they found that exhibitors were not permitted to sell anything on the show floor. They rented the MacArthur Suite at the St. Francis Hotel and directed customers there to purchase the processors. At the suite, the processors were stored in large jars to imply that the chips were in production and readily available. The customers did not know the bottom half of each jar contained non-functional chips. Users were encouraged to make photocopies of the documents, an inexpensive way for MOS Technology to distribute product information. The preliminary data sheets listed just 55 instructions excluding the Rotate Right (ROR) instruction which was not supported on these early chips. The reviews in Byte and EDN noted the lack of the ROR instruction. The next revision of the layout fixed this problem and the May 1976 datasheet listed 56 instructions. Peddle wanted every interested engineer and hobbyist to have access to the chips and documentation; other semiconductor companies only wanted to deal with "serious" customers. For example, Signetics was introducing the 2650 microprocessor and its advertisements asked readers to write for information on their company letterhead.

Motorola lawsuit

The 6501/6502 introduction in print and at Wescon was an enormous success. The downside was that the extensive press coverage got Motorola's attention. On November 3, 1975, Motorola sought an injunction in Federal Court to stop MOS Technology from making and selling microprocessor products. They also filed a lawsuit claiming patent infringement and misappropriation of trade secrets. Motorola claimed that seven former employees joined MOS Technology to create that company's microprocessor products.

Motorola was a billion-dollar company with a plausible case and expensive lawyers. On October 30, 1974, Motorola had filed numerous patent applications on the microprocessor family and was granted twenty-five patents. The first was in June 1976 and the second was to Bill Mensch on July 6, 1976, for the 6820 PIA chip layout. These patents covered the 6800 bus and how the peripheral chips interfaced with the microprocessor. Motorola began making transistors in 1950 and had a portfolio of semiconductor patents. Allen-Bradley decided not to fight this case and sold their interest in MOS Technology back to the founders. Four of the former Motorola engineers were named in the suit: Chuck Peddle, Will Mathys, Bill Mensch and Rod Orgill. All were named inventors in the 6800 patent applications. During the discovery process, Motorola found that one engineer, Mike Janes, had ignored Peddle's instructions and brought his 6800 design documents to MOS Technology. In March 1976, the now independent MOS Technology was running out of money and had to settle the case. They agreed to drop the 6501 processor, pay Motorola ,000 and return the documents that Motorola contended were confidential. Both companies agreed to cross-license microprocessor patents. By November, Commodore had acquired MOS Technology.

Computers and games
With legal troubles behind them, MOS was still left with the problem of getting developers to try their processor, prompting Chuck Peddle to design the MDT-650 ("microcomputer development terminal") single-board computer. Another group inside the company designed the KIM-1, which was sold semi-complete and could be turned into a usable system with the addition of a 3rd party computer terminal and compact cassette drive. While it sold well to its intended market, the company found the KIM-1 also sold well to hobbyists and tinkerers. The related Rockwell AIM-65 control, training, and development system also did well. The software in the AIM 65 was based on that in the MDT. Another roughly similar product was the Synertek SYM-1.

One of the first "public" uses for the design was the Apple I microcomputer, introduced in 1976. The 6502 was next used in the Commodore PET and the Apple II, both released in 1977. It was later used in the Atari 8-bit family and Acorn Atom home computers, the BBC Micro, VIC-20 and other designs both for home computers and business, such as Ohio Scientific and Oric. The 6510, a direct successor of the 6502 with a digital I/O port and a tri-state address bus, was the CPU utilized in the best-selling Commodore 64 home computer. 

Another important use of the 6500 family was in video games. The first to make use of the processor design was the 1977 Atari VCS, later renamed the Atari 2600. The VCS used a 6502 variant named the 6507, which had fewer pins, so it could address only 8 KB of memory. Millions of the Atari consoles would be sold, each with a MOS processor. Another significant use was by the Nintendo Entertainment System and Famicom. The 6502 used in the NES was a second source version by Ricoh, a partial system on a chip, that lacked the binary-coded decimal mode but added 22 memory-mapped registers and on-die hardware for sound generation, joypad reading, and sprite list DMA. Called 2A03 in NTSC consoles and 2A07 in PAL consoles (the difference being the memory divider ratio and a lookup table for audio sample rates), this processor was produced exclusively for Nintendo. The Atari Lynx used a 4 MHz version of the chip, the 65SC02.

6502 or variants were used in all of Commodore's floppy disk drives for all of their 8-bit computers, from the PET line through the Commodore 128D, including the Commodore 64. 8-inch PET drives had two 6502 processors. Atari used the same 6507 used in the Atari VCS for its 810 and 1050 disk drives used for all of their 8-bit computer line, from the 400/800 through the XEGS.

In the 1980s, a popular electronics magazine Elektor/Elektuur used the processor in its microprocessor development board Junior Computer.

Technical description

 

The 6502 is a little-endian 8-bit processor with a 16-bit address bus.

The internal logic runs at the same speed as the external clock rate, but despite the low clock speeds (typically in the neighborhood of 1 to ), the 6502's performance was competitive with other contemporary CPUs using significantly faster clocks. This is partly due to a simple state machine implemented by combinational (clockless) logic to a greater extent than in many other designs; the two-phase clock (supplying two synchronizations per cycle) could thereby control the machine cycle directly. Typical instructions might take half as many cycles to complete on the 6502 as on contemporary designs. Like most simple CPUs of the era, the dynamic NMOS 6502 chip is not sequenced by a microcode ROM  but uses a PLA (which occupied about 15% of the chip area) for instruction decoding and sequencing. As in most 8-bit microprocessors, the chip does some limited overlapping of fetching and execution.

The low clock frequency moderated the speed requirement of memory and peripherals attached to the CPU, as only about 50% of the clock cycle was available for memory access (due to the asynchronous design, this fraction varied strongly among chip versions). This was critical at a time when affordable memory had access times in the range .

Because the chip only accessed memory during certain parts of the clock cycle, and those cycles were indicated by the PHI2-low clock-out pin, other chips in a system could access memory during those times when the 6502 was off the bus. This was sometimes known as "hidden access". This technique was widely used by computer systems; they would use memory capable of access at 2 MHz, and then run the CPU at 1 MHz. This guaranteed that the CPU and video hardware could interleave their accesses, with a total performance matching that of the memory device. When faster memories became available in the 1980s, newer machines could run at higher clock rates, like the 2 MHz CPU in the BBC Micro, and still use the bus sharing techniques.

Registers
Like its precursor, the 6800, the 6502 has very few registers. The 6502's registers include one 8-bit accumulator register (A), two 8-bit index registers (X and Y), 7 processor status flag bits (P; from bit 7 to bit 0 these are the negative (N), overflow (V), reserved, break (B), decimal (D), interrupt disable (I), zero (Z) and carry (C) flag), an 8-bit stack pointer (S), and a 16-bit program counter (PC). This compares to a typical design of the same era, the Z80, which has eight general-purpose 8-bit registers, which can be combined into four 16-bit ones. The Z80 also had a complete set of alternate registers, which made a total of sixteen general-purpose registers.

In order to make up somewhat for the lack of registers, the 6502 included a zero-page addressing mode that uses one address byte in the instruction instead of the two needed to address the full  of memory. This provides fast access to the first  of RAM by using shorter instructions. Chuck Peddle has said in interviews that the specific intention was to allow these first  of RAM to be used like registers.

The stack address space is hardwired to memory page $01, i.e. the address range $0100–$01FF (256–511). Software access to the stack is done via four implied addressing mode instructions, whose functions are to push or pop (pull) the accumulator or the processor status register. The same stack is also used for subroutine calls via the JSR (jump to subroutine) and RTS (return from subroutine) instructions and for interrupt handling.

Addressing
The chip uses the index and stack registers effectively with several addressing modes, including a fast "direct page" or "zero page" mode, similar to that found on the PDP-8, that accesses memory locations from addresses 0 to 255 with a single 8-bit address (saving the cycle normally required to fetch the high-order byte of the address)code for the 6502 uses the zero page much as code for other processors would use registers. On some 6502-based microcomputers with an operating system, the operating system uses most of zero page, leaving only a handful of locations for the user.

Addressing modes also include implied (1-byte instructions); absolute (3 bytes); indexed absolute (3 bytes); indexed zero-page (2 bytes); relative (2 bytes); accumulator (1); indirect,x and indirect,y (2); and immediate (2). Absolute mode is a general-purpose mode. Branch instructions use a signed 8-bit offset relative to the instruction after the branch; the numerical range −128..127 therefore translates to 128 bytes backward and 127 bytes forward from the instruction following the branch (which is 126 bytes backward and 129 bytes forward from the start of the branch instruction). Accumulator mode uses the accumulator as an effective address and does not need any operand data. Immediate mode uses an 8-bit literal operand.

Indirect addressing
The indirect modes are useful for array processing and other looping. With the 5/6 cycle "(indirect),y" mode, the 8-bit Y register is added to a 16-bit base address read from zero page, which is located by a single byte following the opcode. The Y register is therefore an index register in the sense that it is used to hold an actual index (as opposed to the X register in the 6800, where a base address was directly stored and to which an immediate offset could be added). Incrementing the index register to walk the array byte-wise takes only two additional cycles. With the less frequently used "(indirect,x)" mode the effective address for the operation is found at the zero page address formed by adding the second byte of the instruction to the contents of the X register. Using the indexed modes, the zero page effectively acts as a set of up to 128 additional (though very slow) address registers.

The 6502 is capable of performing addition and subtraction in binary or binary-coded decimal. Placing the CPU into BCD mode with the SED (set D flag) instruction results in decimal arithmetic, in which $99 + $01 would result in $00 and the carry (C) flag being set. In binary mode (CLD, clear D flag), the same operation would result in $9A and the carry flag being cleared. Other than Atari BASIC, BCD mode was seldom used in home-computer applications.

See the Hello world! article for a simple but characteristic example of 6502 assembly language.

Instructions and opcodes
6502 instruction operation codes (opcodes) are 8 bits long and have the general form AAABBBCC, where AAA and CC define the opcode, and BBB defines the addressing mode.

For instance, consider the ORA instruction, which performs a bitwise OR on the bits in the accumulator with another value. The instruction opcode is of the form 000bbb01, where bbb may be 010 for an immediate mode value (constant), 001 for zero-page fixed address, 011 for an absolute address, and so on.

This pattern is not absolute, and there are a number of exceptions. However, where it does apply, it allows one to easily deconstruct opcode values back to assembly mnemonics for the majority of instructions, handling the edge cases with special-purpose code.

Of the 256 possible opcodes available using an 8-bit pattern, the original 6502 uses 151 of them, organized into 56 instructions with (possibly) multiple addressing modes. Depending on the instruction and addressing mode, the opcode may require zero, one or two additional bytes for operands. Hence 6502 machine instructions vary in length from one to three bytes. The operand is stored in the 6502's customary little-endian format.

The 65C816, the 16-bit CMOS descendant of the 6502, also supports 24-bit addressing, which results in instructions being assembled with three-byte operands, also arranged in little-endian format.

The remaining 105 opcodes are undefined. In the original design, instructions where the low-order 4 bits (nibble) were 3, 7, B or F were not used, providing room for future expansion. Likewise, the $2x column had only a single entry, LDX #constant. The remaining 25 empty slots were distributed. Some of the empty slots were used in the 65C02 to provide both new instructions and variations on existing ones with new addressing modes. The $Fx instructions were initially left free to allow 3rd-party vendors to add their own instructions, but later versions of the 65C02 standardized a set of bit manipulation instructions developed by Rockwell Semiconductor.

Assembly language
A 6502 assembly language statement consists of a three-character instruction mnemonic, followed by any operands. Instructions that do not take a separate operand but target a single register based on the addressing mode combine the target register in the instruction mnemonic, so the assembler uses INX as opposed to INC X to increment the X register.

Instruction table

Detailed behavior

The processor's non-maskable interrupt (NMI) input is edge sensitive, which means that the interrupt is triggered by the falling edge of the signal rather than its level. The implication of this feature is that a wired-OR interrupt circuit is not readily supported. However, this also prevents nested NMI interrupts from occurring until the hardware makes the NMI input inactive again, often under control of the NMI interrupt handler.

The simultaneous assertion of the NMI and IRQ (maskable) hardware interrupt lines causes IRQ to be ignored. However, if the IRQ line remains asserted after the servicing of the NMI, the processor will immediately respond to IRQ, as IRQ is level sensitive. Thus a sort of built-in interrupt priority was established in the 6502 design.

The B flag is set by the 6502's periodically sampling its NMI edge detector's output and its IRQ input. The IRQ signal being driven low is only recognized though if IRQs are allowed by the I flag. If in this way a NMI request or (maskable) IRQ is detected the B flag is set to zero and causes the processor to execute the BRK instruction next instead of executing the next instruction based on the program counter.

The BRK instruction then pushes the processor status onto the stack, with the B flag bit set to zero. At the end of its execution the BRK instruction resets the B flag's value to one. This is the only way the B flag can be modified. If an instruction other than the BRK instruction pushes the B flag onto the stack as part of the processor status the B flag always has the value one.

A high-to-low transition on the SO input pin will set the processor's overflow status bit. This can be used for fast response to external hardware. For example, a high-speed polling device driver can poll the hardware once in only three cycles using a Branch-on-oVerflow-Clear (BVC) instruction that branches to itself until overflow is set by an SO falling transition. The Commodore 1541 and other Commodore floppy disk drives use this technique to detect when the serializer is ready to transfer another byte of disk data. The system hardware and software design must ensure that an SO will not occur during arithmetic processing and disrupt calculations.

Variations and derivatives 
There are many variants of the original NMOS 6502.

16-bit derivatives
The Western Design Center designed and currently produces the WDC 65C816S processor, a 16-bit, static-core successor to the 65C02. The W65C816S is a newer variant of the 65C816, which is the core of the Apple IIGS computer and is the basis of the Ricoh 5A22 processor that powers the Super Nintendo Entertainment System. The W65C816S incorporates minor improvements over the 65C816 that make the newer chip not an exact hardware-compatible replacement for the earlier one. Among these improvements was conversion to a static core, which makes it possible to stop the clock in either phase without the registers losing data. Available through electronics distributors, as of March 2020, the W65C816S is officially rated for 14 MHz operation.

The Western Design Center also designed and produced the 65C802, which was a 65C816 core with a 64-kilobyte address space in a 65(C)02 pin-compatible package. The 65C802 could be retrofitted to a 6502 board and would function as a 65C02 on power-up, operating in "emulation mode." As with the 65C816, a two-instruction sequence would switch the 65C802 to "native mode" operation, exposing its 16-bit accumulator and index registers, and other 65C816 features. The 65C802 was not widely used and production ended.

Example code
The following 6502 assembly language source code is for a subroutine named TOLOWER, which copies a null-terminated character string from one location to another, converting upper-case letter characters to lower-case letters. The string being copied is the "source", and the string into which the converted source is stored is the "destination".

Bugs and quirks
The 6502 had several bugs and quirks, which had to be accounted for when programming it:

 The earliest revisions of the 6502, such as those shipped with some KIM-1 computers, did not have a ROR (rotate right memory or accumulator) instruction. The operation of ROR in these chips is effectively an ASL (arithmetic shift left) instruction that does not affect the carry bit in the status register. MOS left the instruction out of chip documentation entirely, promising that ROR would appear on 6502 chips starting in 1976. The vast majority of 6502 chips in existence today do not exhibit this quirk.
 The NMOS 6502 family has a variety of undocumented instructions, which vary from one chip manufacturer to another. The 6502 instruction decoding is implemented in a hardwired logic array (similar to a programmable logic array) that is only defined for 151 of the 256 available opcodes. The remaining 105 trigger strange and occasionally hard-to-predict actions, such as crashing the processor, performing two valid instructions consecutively, performing strange mixtures of two instructions, or simply doing nothing at all. Eastern House Software developed the "Trap65", a device that plugged between the processor and its socket to convert (trap) unimplemented opcodes into BRK (software interrupt) instructions. Some programmers utilized this feature to extend the 6502 instruction set by providing functionality for the unimplemented opcodes with specially written software intercepted at the BRK instruction's 0xFFFE vector. All of the undefined opcodes have been replaced with NOP instructions in the 65C02, an enhanced CMOS version of the 6502, although with varying byte sizes and execution times. In the 65C802/65C816, all 256 opcodes perform defined operations.
 The 6502's memory indirect jump instruction, JMP (<address>), is partly broken. If <address> is hex xxFF (i.e., any word ending in FF), the processor will not jump to the address stored in xxFF and xxFF+1 as expected, but rather the one defined by xxFF and xx00 (for example, JMP ($10FF) would jump to the address stored in 10FF and 1000, instead of the one stored in 10FF and 1100). This defect continued through the entire NMOS line, but was corrected in the CMOS derivatives.
 The NMOS 6502 indexed addressing across page boundaries will do an extra read of an invalid address. This characteristic may cause random issues by accessing hardware that acts on a read, such as clearing timer or IRQ flags, sending an I/O handshake, etc. This defect continued through the entire NMOS line, but was corrected in the CMOS derivatives, in which the processor does an extra read of the last instruction byte.
 The 6502 read–modify–write instructions perform one read and two write cycles. First, the unmodified data that was read is written back, and then the modified data is written. This characteristic may cause issues by twice accessing hardware that acts on a write. This anomaly continued through the full NMOS line, but was fixed in the CMOS derivatives, in which the processor does two reads and one write cycle. Defensive programming practice will generally avoid this problem by not executing read/modify/write instructions on hardware registers.
 The N (result negative), V (sign bit overflow) and Z (result zero) status flags are generally meaningless when performing arithmetic operations while the processor is in BCD mode, as these flags reflect the binary, not BCD, result. This limitation was removed in the CMOS derivatives. Therefore, this feature may be used to distinguish a CMOS processor from an NMOS version.
 If the 6502 happens to be in BCD mode when a hardware interrupt occurs, it will not revert to binary mode. This characteristic could result in obscure bugs in the interrupt service routine if it fails to clear BCD mode before performing any arithmetic operations. For example, the Commodore 64's KERNAL did not correctly handle this processor characteristic, requiring that IRQs be disabled or re-vectored during BCD math operations. This issue was addressed in the CMOS derivatives also.
 The 6502 instruction set includes BRK (opcode $00), which is technically a software interrupt (similar in spirit to the SWI mnemonic of the Motorola 6800 and ARM processors). BRK is most often used to interrupt program execution and start a machine language monitor for testing and debugging during software development. BRK could also be used to route program execution using a simple jump table (analogous to the manner in which the Intel 8086 and derivatives handle software interrupts by number). However, if a hardware interrupt occurs when the processor is fetching a BRK instruction, the NMOS version of the processor will fail to execute BRK and instead proceed as if only a hardware interrupt had occurred. This fault was corrected in the CMOS implementation of the processor.
 When executing JSR (jump to subroutine) and RTS (return from subroutine) instructions, the return address pushed to the stack by JSR is that of the last byte of the JSR operand (that is, the most significant byte of the subroutine address), rather than the address of the following instruction. This is because the actual copy (from program counter to stack and then conversely) takes place before the automatic increment of the program counter that occurs at the end of every instruction. This characteristic would go unnoticed unless the code examined the return address in order to retrieve parameters in the code stream (a 6502 programming idiom documented in the ProDOS 8 Technical Reference Manual). It remains a characteristic of 6502 derivatives to this day.
 The read access of the CPU can be delayed by setting the RDY pin to low temporarily. However, during write access, which can take up to three clock cycles for a BRK instruction, the CPU will stop only in the next read cycle. This quirk was corrected in the CMOS derivatives and also in the 6510 and its variants.

See also
 List of 6502 assemblers
 MOS Technology 6502-based home computers
 Transistor count
 Apple II accelerators
 cc65 – 6502 macro assembler and C compiler

Notes

References

Citations

Bibliography
 
 
 
 
Interview with William Mensch Stanford and the Silicon Valley Project, October 9, 1995. Transcript

Further reading
Datasheets and manuals
 6500 Series Datasheet; MOS Technology; 12 pages; 1976.
 6500 Series Hardware Manual; 2nd Ed; MOS Technology; 182 pages; 1976.
 6500 Series Programming Manual; 2nd Ed; MOS Technology; 262 pages; 1976.
Books
 6502 Applications Book; 1st Ed; Rodnay Zaks; Sybex; 281 pages; 1979; . (archive)
 6502 Assembly Language Programming; 2nd Ed; Lance Leventhal; Osborne/McGraw-Hill; 650 pages; 1986; . (archive)
 6502 Assembly Language Subroutines; 1st Ed; Lance Leventhal and Winthrop Saville; Osborne/McGraw-Hill; 550 pages; 1982; . (archive)
 6502 Games; 1st Ed; Rodnay Zaks; Sybex; 292 pages; 1980; . (archive)
 6502 User's Manual; 1st Ed; Joseph Carr; Reston; 288 pages; 1984; . (archive)
 Advanced 6502 Programming; 1st Ed; Rodnay Zaks; John Wiley & Sons; 292 pages; 1982; . (archive)
 Machine Language For Beginners – Personal Computer Machine Language Programming For Atari, VIC, Apple, C64, and PET Computers; 1st Ed; Richard Mansfield; Compute! Publications; 350 pages; 1983; . (archive)
 Programming the 6502; 4th Ed; Rodnay Zaks; Sybex; 408 pages; 1983; . (archive)
 Programming the 65816 – including the 6502, 65C02, 65802; 1st Ed; David Eyes and Ron Lichty; Prentice Hall; 636 pages; 1986; . (archive)
 Microprocessors and Assembly Language; Turkish; 7th Ed; Nurettin Topaloglu; Seckin Yayinevi; 328 pages; 2021; .
Reference cards
 6502 Microprocessor Instant Reference Card; James Lewis; Micro Logic; 2 pages; 1980. (archive)

External links

 6502.org – the 6502 microprocessor resource – repository 
 The Rise of MOS Technology & The 6502 – Commodore archive
 650x information – Concise description, photos of MOS and second source chips; at cpu-collection.de
 mdfs.net – 6502 instruction set
 
 
Simulators, emulators
 Online 6502 compatible assembler and emulator, written in JavaScript 
 List of 6502 software emulators – Zophar's Domain
 6502 simulator for Windows – Atari Gaming Headquarters
 Visual Transistor-level Simulation of 6502 CPU
  – MicroCore Labs
Boards
 Grant's 7/8-chip 6502 board
 6502 microprocessor training board 
 Build your own KIM-1 training board – see KIM-1
 
 PE6502 single board computer 
  – based on Ben Eater videos
FPGA
 cpu6502_tc 6502 CPU core – VHDL source code – OpenCores
 ag_6502 6502 CPU core – Verilog source code – OpenCores
 M65C02 65C02 CPU core – Verilog source code – OpenCores
  – Verilog – MicroCore Labs

MOS Technology microprocessors
65xx microprocessors
Computer-related introductions in 1975
8-bit microprocessors